Felda United Football Club is a Malaysian football club based in Jengka, Pahang which is owned by the Malaysian Federal Land Development Authority (Felda). The club used to compete in the Malaysian football league system but withdrew from the Malaysian league competition in 2020. Known as The Fighters among the fans, Felda United participated in the Malaysian football league from 2007 to 2020.

The team last played in the 2020 Malaysia Super League season, which is Malaysia's top flight league. The club was able to play in the Malaysia Super League after being crowned Malaysian second-tier or second division Malaysia Premier League champions in 2018.

In 2020, the club made the announcement that from 2021, they will no longer participate in the Malaysian football league. A lack of financial support or funding was cited by the club's officials for making such decision to not participate in the national competition.

Club licensing regulations

2019 season
 This club had obtained the Football Association of Malaysia Club License to play in the 2019 Malaysia Super League season.

History

The start 
Felda United Football Club was formed on 19 January 2007 to participate in the Malaysian Football League starting with the 2007 Malaysia FAM Cup. It was initiated by Felda and was officiated by the then Deputy Prime Minister of Malaysia, Najib Razak on 19 January 2007. As football is the number one sport in Malaysia with a large number of supporters, Felda decided to jump into the industry due to the infrastructure and facilities provided on Felda land. The club embarked their journey by making a debut in the Malaysian Football League by playing in the third-tier division league, the Malaysian FAM Cup. Now, the club is well known and supported by the country and its citizens, especially the Felda generations.

The club's tracks 
The club has been one of the more consistent teams in the 2007 Malaysian FAM Cup after placing third, despite their fresh appearance in the industry. The club was promoted into the Premier League from the Malaysian FAM Cup in 2008 after only one season in the Malaysian Football League. Felda United played in the Premier League for 3 seasons and was promoted into the Super League after being champion of the 2010 Malaysia Premier League. After playing consistently in the Super League for 3 seasons, the team had a downfall where they were back in the Premier League for 2014. However, it was not the end for The Fighters as they were placed second in Premier League, promoting them back into Super League for 2015, 2016 and 2017. 2018 came with sorrow as the club was again, demoted into the Premier League as the Football Association of Malaysia (FAM) denied their club license as they failed to submit some documents. In 2019, The Fighters are back to fight heads on against the Super League clubs as they are back in the league with an approved club license from FAM.

The financial downfall 
Towards the end of the 2018 season, the club had a bump on their smooth road of finance. Since September to November 2018, the club did not manage to pay the players and coaching staff in time. The club's former coach, B. Sathianathan mentioned that he exposed this issue to fight for everyone's rights in the team. Shukor Adan represented the team to get legal consultation from the Football Association of Malaysia (FAM) on the overdue payment. The former captain of the team also mentioned that he has been with the club for five seasons and none of these happened before. It gave him a sour memory of his last season with the club.

Not only that, the club had to drop most of their key players such as Syamim Yahya, Wan Zack Haikal, Farizal Harun and all four of the club's import players had to be switched due to financial instability. The head coach, Mohd Nidzam Jamil said the club signed brand new players for the 2019 season as the budget is tight but the club also promotes Felda United's President and Youth squads to fight in the first-tier league, the Super League as this would be a once-in-a-lifetime experience for young players to fight heads on against professional and experienced senior players.

In January 2019, Felda United finally were able to pay at least a month's pay to the players and coaching staff out of three months. The club's president, Anuar Malek, said that they paid at least a month's worth of pay to show that the management is committed in trying to rectify the financial problem. The club made a financial plan to make sure that financial issues does not come up again.

Withdrawal from the Malaysian football league
Following the club's decision to withdraw from the Malaysian football league competition in 2020, the club had announced that 16 staff from the team will be laid off.

In a press statement, Felda Holdings Berhad stated: "Felda wish to inform that FUFC's participation is only for the 2020 season. Starting 2021, FUFC will no longer take part in the M-League. Sixteen FUFC staff will be compensated for the termination of their services in accordance with the terms of their appointments and a notice for the handover of duties has been given to them on Sept 17, 2020.

Grounds

Felda United's current ground is the Tun Abdul Razak Stadium in Jengka, Pahang. The team officially started playing for leagues in the stadium in 2016 until now, as the stadium completed its construction in late 2015.

In their early involvement in the Malaysian Football league, they played in the Petronas Stadium in Bangi, Selangor and also the club has played some matches in Mindef Stadium in Kuala Lumpur whenever the Petronas Stadium was not available. They also played in the Petaling Jaya Stadium and Selayang Stadium in Selangor, Hang Jebat Stadium in Melaka, and Kuala Lumpur Stadium in Kuala Lumpur, before moving to the Tun Abdul Razak Stadium for the 2016 Malaysia Super League season and upcoming seasons.

Sponsorship

Players

Notable Former Players
Muhammad Shukor Adan
Jasazrin Jamaluddin

First-team squad

Felda United Youth Squad
The Felda United Youth consists of 2 squads of Under-21 and Under-19 players which will play for the President Cup and the Youth Cup respectively. These two cups are prominent tournaments among youngsters since its inception in the football industry of Malaysia.

Under-21 squad

Under-19s

Feeder club 
Felda United's reserve team, the Young Fighters, which currently plays the third-tier division, Malaysia FAM League. The club was founded in 2015, funded by its parent company, Felda.

Officials
 Patron:
 President: Anuar Malek
 Deputy president:  Mohd Isa Abu Kassim
 Vice president 1: Anuar Malek
 Vice president 2: Shamsul Anwar Sulaiman
 Secretary general: Zulkarnain Muhammad
 Treasurer: Shahrin Mohd Ali

Team officials

Team managers

Coaches

Honours and achievements

Honours

League

 Malaysia Super League
 Runners-up: 2016

 Malaysia Premier League
 Winners: 2010, 2018
 Runners-up: 2014

Cups 
 Malaysia FA Cup
 Runners-up: 2014

Achievements

Source:

AFC competitions

Performance in AFC competitions

 AFC Cup: 1 Appearance
 2017: Group stage

AFC clubs ranking

Contiental record

References

External links

 Official website

 
2007 establishments in Malaysia
Association football clubs established in 2007
Football clubs in Malaysia
Malaysia Super League clubs